Lt General Vijay Lall, PVSM, AVSM, ADC is a veteran Indian Army General Officer. His military career spanned about four decades, where he last served as the 15th  Indian Director General Ordnance Services of the Army.  He was also the Senior Colonel Commandant AOC. Vjay is the 1st Director General Ordnance Services of this new millennium.

Early life and education 
He did his schooling at the Modern School, Barakhamba Road, New Delhi. He joined the National Defence Academy, Khadakwasla, Pune (NDA) in 1958 followed by the Indian Military Academy, Dehradun (IMA); graduating in June 1962.

In addition, Vijay is an alumnus of various defence and civil training institutions namely the College of Materials Management (CMM), Jabalpur; College of Defence Management (CDM), Secunderabad; Indian Institute of Public Administration (IIPA), New Delhi and Army War College (AWC), Mhow.

Military career 
Vijay was commissioned in the AOC on 10 June 1962.  He completed his infantry attachment with Third-First Gorkha Rifles (PVC Battalion) where he was a Platoon Commander in the Bravo company. During his career, he held various command, staff, instructional and regimental appointments. He is a specialist in Materials management, ammunition and explosives technology and holds a master's degree in Materials Management from University of Jabalpur.(RDVV)

He  commanded units after attaining the rank of Captain up to Lt General. His various command appointments include commanding a Mobile Ammunition Repair Section (MARS), Ordnance Maintenance Company(OMC), an Independent Foreign Army Unit in Nigeria (during the years 1979-1981), a Division Ordnance Unit.

Besides, he also served in staff appointments as the Assistant Adjutant General(AAG) of a Sub-Area and Director-Coordination at Army Headquarters.

Promoted to the rank of Brigadier, Vijay assumed the office of Commandant, COD Dehu Road  and in addition was also the Station Commander of the Military Garrison & President of the Cantonment Board. Succeeding this, he was the Deputy Director General  at Army Headquarters.

After promotion to Major General, he took over as  MGAOC (Southern Command).

Following which, he was selected to be Member Army (Ex-Officio Joint Secretary to Government of India)  of Special Surplus Stores Disposal Committee, a high-level empowered committee of  the Ministry of Defence. Vijay thereafter served as Additional Director General at Army Headquarters.

After promotion to the rank of Lt General, he was appointed as Commandant of the College of Materials Management.

On 1 Jan 2001, the Government of India appointed him as the 15th Director General Ordnance Services.

He was awarded by the President of India twice for distinguished services and Commendation by the Chief of Army Staff (COAS) during his career.

Honours and awards

He has received the following medals, decorations and commendations in his military career:

 Param Vishisht Seva Medal for distinguished services of the most exceptional order to the nation.
 Ati Vishisht Seva Medal for distinguished services of  an exceptional order to the nation.
 Chief of Army Staff Commendation

Besides these, he was appointed as Honorary Aide-de-Camp to the President of India.

Vijay was responsible for securing the coveted Golden Peacock National Training Award in the year 2000 for the College of Materials Management (CMM), Jabalpur, Madhya Pradesh. He received the award from the then Home Minister and Deputy Prime Minister of India.

He was awarded  Modernites Excellence Award 2013 by The Modern School Old Students Association (MSOSA),

Dates of rank

Other assignments 
Professor(Management), Rani Durgavati Vishwavidyalaya, RDVV (Formerly, University of Jabalpur) Jabalpur, Madhya Pradesh

Dean of Management, Rani Durgavati Vishwavidyalaya, RDVV (Formerly, University of Jabalpur) Jabalpur, Madhya Pradesh

Member; Executive Council, Rani Durgavati Vishwavidyalaya, RDVV (Formerly, University of Jabalpur) Jabalpur, Madhya Pradesh

President, Dehu Road Cantonment Board, Pune District, Maharashtra

Director on the Board of Directors of Indraprastha Medical Corporation Limited (Apollo Hospitals Group) for over a decade.

He is also a:

 Fellow, All India Management Association 

 Distinguished Fellow, Institute of Directors

 Distinguished Fellow, Indian Institute of Materials Management

 Member, MP - Institute for Defence Studies and Analyses

 Member, United Services Institute of India

References

Indian generals
1942 births
Indian Military Academy alumni
Recipients of the Ati Vishisht Seva Medal
Recipients of the Param Vishisht Seva Medal
National Defence Academy (India) alumni
Modern School (New Delhi) alumni
Living people
New Delhi
College of Defence Management alumni
Army War College, Mhow alumni